Ériu is an academic journal of Irish language studies. It was established in 1904 as the journal of the School of Irish Learning in Dublin. When the school was incorporated into the Royal Irish Academy in 1926, the academy continued publication of the journal, in the same format and with the same title. Originally, the journal was published in two parts annually, together making a volume, but parts slipped further apart after Volume III. Articles are written in either Irish or English.

References

External links 
 
 Contents of Ériu vols. 1-46
 Scans of the first three volumes, at the Internet Archive

Irish language
Linguistics journals
Publications established in 1904
Multilingual journals
English-language journals
Irish-language journals
Annual journals
Royal Irish Academy